Ruth Sebatindira is a Ugandan corporate and tax lawyer who, effective January 2020, is the Administrator of Uganda Telecom Limited, a government-owned telecommunications company, under court administration since April 2017.

Background and education
Sebatindira was born in Kampala, Uganda, in 1973. She holds a Bachelor of Laws degree, obtained from Makerere University, Uganda's oldest and largest public university. She also holds a postgraduate Diploma in Legal Practice, awarded by the Law Development Centre, in Kampala, Uganda's capital city. Her Master of Laws degree was obtained from the University of Manchester, in the United Kingdom.

Career
Sebatindira was called to the bar in 1997, and started her career as an associate at Kalenge, Bwanika, Kimuli & Company, Advocates in Kampala where she worked for five years. She then worked at Deloitte Uganda as Senior Tax Advisor until 2003, when she founded Ligomarc Advocates. She is the partner in charge of tax and infrastructure at Ligomarc Advocates.

In 2003, Sebatindira founded Ligomarc Advocates, a Kampala-based law firm, as a solo practice. Later others joined the practice, and as of January 2020, the firm has four partners, 18 lawyers and a total staff of 45.

Her work over the past 23 years has included corporate insolvency, shareholder disputes, lender enforcement actions, tax advisory services, intellectual property and commercial projects negotiations and contracts. As of January 2020, she is actively involved in advising clients on tax implications in financing agreements, oil agreements, energy transactions and infrastructure development.

On 2 January 2020, Justice Lydia Mugambe of the Civil Division of the High Court of Uganda appointed Sebatindira as the Administrator of Uganda Telecom Limited, a parastatal company in court-appointed receivership since April 2017. Sebatindira took over the administration of UTL from Bemanya Twebaze on 6 January 2020.

Memberships and affiliations
Sebatindira is a member of the Uganda Law Society, the East Africa Law Society, the International Bar Association, the International Fiscal Association, and the Association of International Petroleum Negotiators.

Other considerations
She served as the president of the Uganda Law Society from 2013 until 2016. She served as founding chairperson of the Women Lawyers Committee at the Uganda Law Society in 2011. She is a Commissioner at the Judicial Service Commission, which advises the President of Uganda on the appointment of judges.

References

External links
 Profile at Worldpulse.com

Living people
1973 births
20th-century Ugandan lawyers
Ugandan women lawyers
Makerere University alumni
Law Development Centre alumni
21st-century Ugandan businesswomen
21st-century Ugandan businesspeople
Alumni of the University of Manchester
People from Western Region, Uganda
Ugandan women company founders
21st-century Ugandan lawyers